Donald Adeosun Faison (born June 22, 1974) is an American actor and comedian, best known for his leading role as Dr. Chris Turk in the ABC/NBC comedy-drama Scrubs (2001–2010), and a supporting role as Murray in both the film Clueless (1995) and the subsequent television series of the same name. He also starred as Phil Chase in the TV Land sitcom The Exes (2011–2015). Faison has also co-starred in the films Waiting to Exhale (1995), Remember the Titans (2000), Uptown Girls (2003), Something New (2006), Next Day Air (2009), Skyline (2010), and Kick-Ass 2 (2013).

Early life
Faison was born in Harlem in New York City, the son of Shirley, a talent agent, and Donald Faison, a building manager. His parents divorced in 1992. He is the older brother of singer/musician Olamide Faison. His middle name stems from the words "ade" (meaning "crown") and "osun" (meaning "river of life") in the west African language of Yoruba. His parents were active with the National Black Theatre in Harlem. He attended the Professional Children's School in Manhattan with his best friend, actor Dash Mihok.

Career
Faison first appeared in a 1989 commercial for Folgers coffee at the age of 15, in which he played the younger brother of a soldier returning from war. In 1992, he appeared with Malik Yoba in the ABC News special Prejudice: Answering Children's Questions, hosted by Peter Jennings. He also had a small role in Sugar Hill starring Wesley Snipes. He then became famous for his role as Murray Duvall in the 1995 film Clueless and the subsequent television series, which ran from 1996 to 1999. In 1995, he also appeared in Waiting to Exhale as Tarik, the son of Loretta Devine's character, Gloria. He was featured in New Jersey Drive. He also starred in Big Fat Liar alongside Frankie Muniz, Paul Giamatti, and Amanda Bynes. He had a recurring role as Tracy on Felicity, appeared in Remember the Titans as the running-back turned corner-back Petey Jones, and provided voice work for various characters in the MTV animated series Clone High. He had minor roles in the sitcoms Sister, Sister and Sabrina, the Teenage Witch, and in the film Josie and the Pussycats. In 2005, Faison produced one episode of MTV's Punk'd involving his Scrubs co-star Zach Braff. He also appeared in the music videos for Brandy's "Sittin' Up in My Room," Fall Out Boy's cover of Michael Jackson's "Beat It," and Gavin Degraw's "Chariot."

In 2008, Faison voiced Gary the Stormtrooper in Robot Chicken: Star Wars Episode II. Afterwards, he interned on the Robot Chicken show to learn more about stop motion animation, and started a Star Wars-themed Lego stop-motion show, BlackStormTrooper, on his YouTube channel, shundigga.

On February 13, 2009, Faison participated in the NBA All-Star Weekend Celebrity Game. Other celebrities participating included NBA Hall of Famers Clyde Drexler and Dominique Wilkins, NFL wide receiver Terrell Owens, actor Chris Tucker, and four Harlem Globetrotters.

In 2010, Faison starred alongside Scottie Thompson, Brittany Daniel, Eric Balfour, Laz Alonso, and Crystal Reed in the Brothers Strause science fiction thriller Skyline.

Faison was in the 2010 CBS comedy pilot The Odds.

As of March 2011, Faison appeared in commercials for The Sims Medieval. In 2012, he made a cameo appearance in the movie Pitch Perfect. In 2013, Faison hosted the short-lived TBS comedy sketch show Who Gets the Last Laugh?. From 2016 to 2018, he hosted the GSN game show Winsanity.

From 2018 until 2020, Faison voiced pilot Hype Fazon, a character written and named for him by Dave Filoni, in Star Wars Resistance. Faison had caught Filoni's attention via his stop motion Star Wars cartoons.

Faison and Scrubs co-star Zach Braff co-host the rewatch podcast Fake Doctors, Real Friends, which launched in March 2020, sharing their stories and experiences of shooting the show. The podcast is distributed by iHeartRadio.

Personal life

In 1997, Faison started dating Lisa Askey, a nursing student. The two were married from 2001 to 2005. After six years of dating, Faison married his second wife, CaCee Cobb, on December 15, 2012. The wedding was held at the home of Faison's former Scrubs co-star and best friend Zach Braff, who also served as a groomsman. Serving as a bridesmaid was singer Jessica Simpson, for whom Cobb formerly worked as a personal assistant.

Faison has six children: son Shawn, born in 1997, with ex-girlfriend Audrey Ince; fraternal boy-girl twins Dade and Kaya born in 1999, and son Kobe, born in 2001, with first wife Lisa Askey; and with second wife Cobb, a son Rocco born in 2013 and a daughter Wilder, born in 2015. Dade, Kaya, and Kobe moved in with Donald and CaCee after their mother Lisa Askey died in 2017.

Filmography

Film

Television

Music videos

Video games
A dance that Faison performs during an episode of Scrubs is featured in the video game Fortnite. Faison's permission was not sought before including the dance, and he did not receive royalties for it.

Awards and nominations

References

External links

1974 births
Living people
African-American game show hosts
African-American male actors
American male film actors
American male television actors
American male voice actors
Comedians from New York City
Male actors from New York City
People from Harlem
20th-century African-American people
21st-century African-American people
20th-century American comedians
21st-century American comedians
20th-century American male actors
21st-century American male actors